Clive Puzey (born 11 July 1941) is a former racing driver from Rhodesia.  He began taking part in the South African Formula One Championship in 1963 with a Lotus 18/21, finishing seventh in the Rand Grand Prix the following year. He was born in Bulawayo.

Puzey's only Formula One World Championship Grand Prix attempt came when he entered the 1965 South African Grand Prix with his Lotus-Climax, but he failed to pre-qualify.  He was one of only three drivers from Rhodesia (modern-day Zimbabwe) to enter a World Championship Formula One race.

He continued to race in the South African Formula One Championship until 1969, scoring three podiums in 1966. After his racing career ended, Puzey ran a garage in his home town of Bulawayo until 2000. Being an outspoken critic of Robert Mugabe's government, he was repeatedly threatened until he left the country and moved to Australia.

Complete Formula One World Championship results
(key)

Non-championship Formula One results
(key)

Notes and references

"The Formula One Record Book" - John Thompson, 1974.
www.forix.com

Sportspeople from Bulawayo
Zimbabwean people of British descent
White Rhodesian people
Zimbabwean exiles
Rhodesian Formula One drivers
1941 births
Living people
Zimbabwean emigrants to Australia